Clara Louise Zinke (March 30, 1909 in Cincinnati – April 20, 1978) was an American tennis player in the early part of the 20th century.

She competed on the national level as a junior and adult. She was a singles finalist in the U.S. National Girls singles championship of 1926, and at the storied international tennis tournament in Cincinnati, she won more total titles (12) than any other woman in tournament history:
Singles Titles (5): 1926, '27, '29, '30 & '31
Mixed Doubles Title (1): 1931
Doubles Titles (6): 1927, '28, '30, '31, '32 & '33	

She still holds tournament records in Cincinnati for most total finals appearances (18), most singles finals appearances (10) and most doubles finals appearances (7) for both men and women. (The other appearance was in mixed doubles, which she won, in 1931.) In 2004 she was inducted into the Cincinnati Tennis Hall of Fame.

Other Career Highlights:
Ranked No. 1 in 1928 & 1929 USTA/Midwest section singles rankings
Ranked No. 1 in doubles in 1928, 1929 & 1931 USTA/Midwest section rankings with Ruth Oexman
Ranked No. 2 in the USTA/Midwest section singles rankings in 1927 (behind Marion Leighton of Chicago) and 1931 (behind U.S. top tenner Catherine Wolf)
Singles Champion: 1929 Western Indoor Championship; 1929 Ohio State Championships; 1927 Michigan State Championships
Singles Finalist: 1927, 1929 & 1930 Western Tennis Championship; 1927, 1929 & 1930 Illinois State Championship
Singles Semifinalist: 1931 Western Tennis Championship; 1928 South Atlantic Championships in Augusta; 1926 Illinois State Championship
Doubles Champion: 1928, 1929 and 1931 Western Championship; 1929 Illinois State Championship; 1927 Michigan State Championships
Doubles Finalist: 1926 & 1927 Illinois State Championship; 1927 Western Tennis Championship; 1929 Eastern Grass Court Championships
U.S. National Championships at Forest Hills, NY – reached the second round in 1929
Mixed Doubles Champion: 1929 Western Indoor Championship
Mixed Doubles Finalist: 1926 Western Clay Court Championships with future Hall of Famer George Lott; 1929 Seabright (NJ) Tournament with J. Gilbert Hall

External links
 Clara Louise Zinke at Find A Grave
 "From Club Court to Center Court, The Evolution of Professional Tennis in Cincinnati" By Phillip S. Smith; 2022 Edition - pages 14, 79, 120, et al 

American female tennis players
Tennis players from Cincinnati
1909 births
1978 deaths
20th-century American women
20th-century American people